Eduard Antonavich Vaytsyakhovich (3 April 1960 – 12 January 2022) was a Belarusian politician. A member of the United Civic Party, he served in the Supreme Council of Belarus from 9 January to 27 November 1996. He died in Kamarova on 12 January 2022, at the age of 61.

References

1960 births
2022 deaths
Members of the National Assembly of Belarus
People from Myadzyel District
United Civic Party of Belarus politicians